Chiojdeanca is a commune in Prahova County, Muntenia, Romania. It is composed of three villages: Chiojdeanca, Nucet, and Trenu.

The commune lies on both banks of the river Chiojdeanca, surrounded by the Sub Carpathian hills.

Natives
 Andrei Rădulescu (1880–1959), jurist, President of the High Court of Cassation and Justice from 1938 to 1940, President of the Romanian Academy from 1946 to 1948.
 Eugen Simion (1933–2022), literary critic and historian.

References

Chiojdeanca
Localities in Muntenia